Jiménez is a municipality in the Mexican state of Michoacán, located approximately  west of the state capital of Morelia.

Geography
It borders the municipalities of Puruándiro to the north, Morelos to the northeast, Huaniqueo to the east, Coeneo to the southeast, Zacapu to the southwest, and Panindícuaro to the northwest.

As of 2009, the land cover in Jiménez consists of grassland (16%), temperate forest (10%), matorral (5%) and tropical forest (4%). Another 56% of the land is used for agriculture and 2% consists of urban areas. Jiménez is drained by the Ángulo River, a tributary of the Lerma River which flows south to north through the municipality.

Jiménez has a temperate climate with rain in the summer.

History
In the mid-19th century, stagecoaches running between Zamora and Morelia forded the Ángulo River at what is now Villa de Jiménez. A man named Patrocinio Aguilar lived there and supplied travellers with provisions, so that the place became known as Vado de Aguilar ("Aguilar's Ford"). On May 30, 1910, the settlement was granted the status of a town (villa) and renamed after Mariano Jiménez, governor of Michoacán from 1885 to 1892.

Originally part of the municipality of Zacapu, Jiménez became an independent municipality on 1 May 1921.

Administration
The municipal government comprises a president, a councillor (Spanish: síndico), and seven trustees (regidores), four elected by relative majority and three by proportional representation. The current president of the municipality is Arturo León Balvanera.

Demographics
In the 2010 Mexican Census, the municipality of Jiménez recorded a population of 13,275 inhabitants living in 3851 households. The 2015 Intercensal Survey estimated a population of 12,426 inhabitants in Jiménez.

There are 25 localities in the municipality, of which only the municipal seat Villa Jiménez is classified as urban. It recorded a population of 4249 inhabitants in the 2010 Census.

Economy
The main economic activity in Jiménez is agriculture. Corn is the main crop, followed by sorghum and forage oats. Chicken, cattle and pigs are also raised.

References

Municipalities of Michoacán
1921 establishments in Mexico
States and territories established in 1921